Paul Lovegrove was a Michigan politician.

Political life
The Flint City Commission selected Lovegrove as mayor in 1950 and then selected him again for another year.

References

Mayors of Flint, Michigan
20th-century American politicians